Georg Haas (19 January 1905, Vienna, Austria – 13 September 1981 Jerusalem, Israel) was an Austrian-born Israeli herpetologist, malacologist and paleontologist, one of the founders of zoological research in Israel. Haas studied zoology in the University of Vienna. In 1932 he joined the Hebrew University staff and during the next four decades Haas influenced several generations of young Israeli scientists.

Legacy
Georg Haas is commemorated in the scientific names of two species of lizards, Acanthodactylus haasi and Sphenomorphus haasi, and the Cretaceous legged basal snake Haasiophis.

References

Further reading
Werner YL (1965). "Georg Haas: On the occasion of his sixtieth birthday". Israel Journal of Zoology 14 (1–4): 5–6. 
Werner YL (1982). "Georg Haas, 1905–1981". Copeia 1982 (2): 491–493.
Gans, Carl (1983). "Georg Haas, 1905–1981". American Zoologist 23: 343–346.

Austrian herpetologists
Austrian paleontologists
20th-century Israeli zoologists
Paleozoologists
1905 births
1981 deaths
Israeli herpetologists
Israeli malacologists
Israeli paleontologists
Academic staff of the Hebrew University of Jerusalem
Austrian emigrants to Mandatory Palestine
20th-century Austrian zoologists
University of Vienna alumni
Scientists from Vienna
Natural history of Palestine (region)
Natural history of Israel